The Protos is an electric multiple unit  built by the German company Fahrzeugtechnik Dessau.

Details
The train is built with two coaches. The train has a low floor, so that there is no or little step between the platform height and the trains. The height is 810 mm. The prototype unit left the factory in September 2006 and was displayed at InnoTrans 2006. The only user of these units is Connexxion on the Valleilijn between Amersfoort and Ede-Wageningen in the Netherlands.

UIC and coach numbers

Services operating

Gallery

References

External links 
 

Electric multiple units of Germany
Electric multiple units of the Netherlands
1500 V DC multiple units